Pom Prap is one of five khwaengs (subdistricts) of Pom Prap Sattru Phai district, Bangkok. In February 2019 it had a total population of 15,440 people (7,444 men, 7,956 women). The majority of the population consists of Thais and Thai Chinese.

History
Its name after a fort was called "Pom Prap Sattru Phai", southward of Nang Leong Ban Yuan (near Nopphawong Bridge in present day). It was one of the eight forts built along two banks of Khlong Phadung Krung Kasem according to the King Mongkut (Rama IV)'s orders. When Bangkok was expanding, the government therefore removed these forts.

Geography
Neighbouring subdistricts are (from the north clockwise): Wat Thep Sirin in its district, Rong Mueang of Pathum Wan District, Maha Phruettharam of Bang Rak District, Talat Noi and Samphanthawong of Samphanthawong District, and Ban Bat in its district.

Places

Important places
Wat Mangkon Kamalawat (Wat Leng Noei Yi)
Kwang Tung Shrine (Kwong Siew Commerce Association of Thailand)
Poh Teck Tung Foundation and Tai Hong Kong Shrine
Wat Khanikaphon
Lee Ti Miew Shrine
Plubplachai 1 Police Station and Plubplachai 2 Police Station 
Wat Phlapphla Chai
Maitrichit Chinese Baptist Church
Bangkok Metropolitan Administration General Hospital (Klang Hospital)
Khlong Thom Market and Sua Pa Plaza
Saipanya School Under the Royal Patronage of her Majesty the Queen 
Kia Hua Tong Nguan (Sirinakorn) Chinese Newspaper Headquarters

Transport
Main roads
Charoen Krung Road (New Road)
Phlapphla Chai Road
Worachak Road
Rama IV Road

Minor roads
Suea Pa Road
Mangkon Road
Paribatra Road
 Maitri Chit Road
 Santiphap Road 
 Mittraphan Road
 Wongwian Yi Sip Song Karakadakhom Road
Wang Chao Sai Road
Krung Kasem Road
 Chao Khamrop Road
Yommarat Sukhum Road
Issaranuphap Lane

Intersections
22 July Circle
Mo Mi Intersection
Maitri Chit Square
Nopphawong Square

References

Subdistricts of Bangkok
Pom Prap Sattru Phai district